The next Portuguese legislative election  will take place on or before 11 October 2026 to elect members of the Assembly of the Republic to the 16th Legislature of Portugal. All 230 seats to the Assembly of the Republic will be at stake.

Background

Politics of Portugal

The President of Portugal has the power to dissolve the Assembly of the Republic by their own will. Unlike in other countries, the President can refuse to dissolve the parliament at the request of the Prime Minister or the Assembly of the Republic and all the parties represented in Parliament. If the Prime Minister resigns, the President must appoint a new Prime Minister after listening to all the parties represented in Parliament and then the government programme must be subject to discussion by the Assembly of the Republic, whose members of parliament may present a motion to reject the upcoming government.

Date 
According to the Portuguese Constitution, an election must be called between 14 September and 14 October of the year that the legislature ends. The election is called by the President of Portugal but is not called at the request of the Prime Minister; however, the President must listen to all of the parties represented in Parliament and the election day must be announced at least 60 days before the election. If an election is called during an ongoing legislature (dissolution of parliament) it must be held at least after 55 days. Election day is the same in all multi-seats constituencies, and should fall on a Sunday or national holiday. The next legislative election must, therefore, take place no later than 11 October 2026.

Leadership changes

CDS – People's Party
In the 2022 elections, the CDS–People's Party was wiped out from Parliament for the first time in 47 years of democracy. CDS leader Francisco Rodrigues dos Santos resigned on election night and announced that a leadership ballot would be held. On 11 February, it was announced that a new leader would be elected in a party congress on 2 and 3 April 2022 held in Guimarães. MEP Nuno Melo, former MP Nuno Correia da Silva, 2016 leadership candidate Miguel Mattos Chaves and Bruno Filipe Costa announced they would contest the ballot. During the congress, Bruno Filipe Costa and Nuno Correia da Silva dropped out from the race. Nuno Melo was easily elected as leader with more than 73% of the votes. The results were the following:

|- style="background-color:#0c68b0"
! align="center" colspan=2 style="width:  60px"|Candidate
! align="center" style="width:  50px"|Votes
! align="center" style="width:  50px"|%
|-
|bgcolor=|
| align=left | Nuno Melo
| align=right | 854
| align=right | 77.5
|-
|bgcolor=|
| align=left | Miguel Mattos Chaves
| align=right | 104
| align=right | 9.4
|-
|bgcolor=|
| align=left | Others
| align=right | 144
| align=right | 13.1
|- style="background-color:#E9E9E9"
| colspan=2 style="text-align:left;" |   Turnout
| align=right | 1,102
| align=center | 
|-
| colspan="4" align=left|Source: Results
|}

Social Democratic Party

After the Social Democratic Party's (PSD) defeat in the 2022 legislative election, Rui Rio announced he would not run again for the PSD leadership and would call a snap leadership ballot in order to elect a new leader. The ballot was held on 28 May 2022. Luís Montenegro, former PSD parliamentary group leader (2011-2018), and Jorge Moreira da Silva, former Environment minister (2013-2015), were the only candidates on the ballot. Around 45,000 party members, out of more than 85,000 active members, registered to vote. Montenegro defeated Moreira da Silva by a landslide, becoming the 19th leader of the PSD. The results were the following:

|- style="background-color:#E9E9E9"
! align="center" colspan=2 style="width:  60px"|Candidate
! align="center" style="width:  50px"|Votes
! align="center" style="width:  50px"|%
|-
|bgcolor=orange|
| align=left | Luís Montenegro
| align=right | 19,241
| align=right | 72.5
|-
|bgcolor=orange|
| align=left | Jorge Moreira da Silva
| align=right | 7,306
| align=right | 27.5
|-
| colspan=2 align=left | Blank/Invalid ballots
| align=right | 437
| align=right | –
|-
|- style="background-color:#E9E9E9"
| colspan=2 style="text-align:left;" |   Turnout
| align=right | 26,984
| align=right | 60.46
|-
| colspan="4" align=left|Source: Official results
|}

Portuguese Communist Party
On 5 November 2022, the Portuguese Communist Party (PCP) announced that Jerónimo de Sousa, party leader since 2004, was departing from the leadership because of health reasons and the demands that the post requires. The party choose Paulo Raimundo, a party employee and member since 1994, as new leader whose nomination was confirmed in a Central Committee meeting on 12 November 2022 by unanimous vote, with one abstention, from Raimundo himself. The results were the following:

|- style="background-color:#E9E9E9"
! align="center" colspan=2 style="width:  60px"|Candidate
! align="center" style="width:  50px"|Votes
! align="center" style="width:  50px"|%
|-
|bgcolor=#f00|
| align=left | Paulo Raimundo
| align=right | 128
| align=right | 99.2
|-
| colspan=2 align=left | Against
| align=right | 0
| align=right | 0.0
|-
| colspan=2 align=left | Abstention
| align=right | 1
| align=right | 0.8
|-
|- style="background-color:#E9E9E9"
| colspan=2 style="text-align:left;" |   Turnout
| align=right | 129
| align=center | 
|-
| colspan="4" align=left|Source: Results
|}

Liberal Initiative
On 23 October 2022, party leader João Cotrim Figueiredo announced he was leaving the party leadership and called a snap leadership ballot. Shortly after Cotrim's announcement, MP Rui Rocha from Braga, stepped forward and announced his intention to run for the leadership. Two days after, Carla Castro, MP from Lisbon, also presented her candidacy to the leadership. A few weeks later, the party decided on a date, and location, for the leadership ballot and the new leader would be elected in a National Convention between 21 and 22 January 2023 in Lisbon. A third candidate for the leadership, José Cardoso, critic of Figueiredo's leadership and strategy, announced his candidacy on 2 January 2023. Around 2,300 party members registered to vote in the leadership convention. Rui Rocha was elected as the 4th President of the Liberal Initiative with almost 52% of the votes. The results were the following:

|- style="background-color:#0c68b0"
! align="center" colspan=2 style="width:  60px"|Candidate
! align="center" style="width:  50px"|Votes
! align="center" style="width:  50px"|%
|-
|bgcolor=#00ADEF|
| align=left | Rui Rocha
| align=right | 888
| align=right | 51.7
|-
|bgcolor=#00ADEF|
| align=left | Carla Castro
| align=right | 757
| align=right | 44.0
|-
|bgcolor=#00ADEF|
| align=left | José Cardoso
| align=right | 74
| align=right | 4.3
|-
| colspan=2 align=left | Blank/Invalid ballots
| align=right | 9 
| align=right | –
|- style="background-color:#E9E9E9"
| colspan=2 style="text-align:left;" |   Turnout
| align=right | 1,728
| align=right | 74.26
|-
| colspan="4" align=left|Source:
|}

Left Bloc
On 14 February 2023, party coordinator Catarina Martins announced she would not run for another term as party leader. Her reasons were that the party needs someone new to lead it, that in the party there are not very long periods of leadership and that the "new political cycle" forces a change. A party leadership convention will be held during 27 and 28 May 2023, in Lisbon.

While names like MEP Marisa Matias and caucus leader Pedro Filipe Soares have discarded a candidacy for the leadership, MP Mariana Mortágua will run for the party leadership. Her candidacy was confirmed on 27 February 2023. A list of critics of the current party leadership, led by former MP Pedro Soares, will oppose Mortágua in the convention ballot.

Electoral system 
The Assembly of the Republic has 230 members elected to four-year terms. Governments do not require absolute majority support of the Assembly to hold office, as even if the number of opposers of government is larger than that of the supporters, the number of opposers still needs to be equal or greater than 116 (absolute majority) for both the Government's Programme to be rejected or for a motion of no confidence to be approved.

The number of seats assigned to each district depends on the district magnitude. The use of the d'Hondt method makes for a higher effective threshold than certain other allocation methods such as the Hare quota or Sainte-Laguë method, which are more generous to small parties.

The distribution of MPs by electoral district in the 2022 general election was the following:

Parties 

The table below lists parties currently represented in the Assembly of the Republic.

Opinion polling

Polling aggregations

See also
 Elections in Portugal
 List of political parties in Portugal
 Politics of Portugal

Notes

References

External links 
 Marktest Opinion Poll Tracker
 Official results site, Portuguese Justice Ministry
 Portuguese Electoral Commission
 ERC - Official publication of polls
 Average of polls and seat simulator

Future elections in Europe
Legislative elections in Portugal